Nghiem may refer to:

People
 Chu Đình Nghiêm, Vietnamese footballer and coach
 Lê Văn Nghiêm, Vietnamese soldier
 Nghiêm Xuân Tú, Vietnamese footballer
 Nguyễn Tư Nghiêm, Vietnamese painter
 Saran Nghiem (born 2003), English squash player
 Son Van Nghiem, American engineer

Places
 Vĩnh Nghiêm Pagoda